Darien station is a commuter rail stop on the Metro-North Railroad's New Haven Line, located in Darien, Connecticut. A small station house is located on the north side of the tracks (New York City-bound side). The station is wheelchair accessible, with elevators at the east end, near the Boston Post Road.

The station is located downtown at the intersection of the Post Road (U.S. Route 1, the town's main thoroughfare) and West Avenue.

History
Downtown Darien, originally known as "Darien Depot", grew up around the train station, replacing the Noroton commercial district (2–3 miles to the east, along the Post Road) by the 1870s. By then, the train connection to New York City allowed wealthy New Yorkers to build vacation homes along the shore, beginning Darien's history as a wealthy suburb. 

In the 1890s, the railroad tracks were raised above the street level, creating the railroad bridges over the Post Road, which marks the east side of the station, and over Leroy Avenue, at the western end. A Chinese laundry business has been located near the station since the 1890s, operated by various owners.

The historic station building was rehabilitated in 2002. In recent years the town government of Darien has been collecting parking revenue from the station, which has gone into an improvement fund. As of 2007, the town received revenues of about $100,000 from both stations in Darien.

Station layout
The station has two high-level side platforms, each 10 cars long. The northern platform, adjacent to Track 3, is generally used by westbound trains. The southern platform, adjacent to Track 4, is generally used by eastbound trains. The New Haven Line has four tracks at this location. The two inner tracks, not adjacent to either platform, are used only by express trains.

A small bus-stop shelter is located on the Boston Post Road at the southeast corner of the station (near the New Haven-bound tracks) for buses going along the Post Road into Stamford. Across the Post Road, buses can be boarded for trips into Norwalk. In the small parking lot around the station house, a Connecticut Transit Stamford bus on Bus Route 42 takes passengers along West Avenue and Glenbrook Road into the Glenbrook section of Stamford. Taxis regularly wait for passengers in the small parking lot adjacent to the New Haven-bound tracks. Entrances and exits to Interstate 95 are on Tokeneke Road (exit 12) and the Boston Post Road (exit 11).

Several parking lots on both sides of the tracks serve the station with a total of 860 spaces. The state owns the parking lots nearest the Post Road and on the west (south) side of the tracks between the Post Road and Leroy Avenue (with 195 spaces). The town owns the "Leroy West" parking lot west of Leroy Avenue (toward New York City). The parking lot at the corner of West and Leroy Avenues is privately owned.

Bibliography

References

External links

The Subway Nut Web site page for Darien station
 Post Road entrance from Google Maps Street View
 http://www.ct.gov/dot/lib/dot/documents/dpt/1_Station_Inspection_Summary_Report.pdf

Metro-North Railroad stations in Connecticut
Stations on the Northeast Corridor
Buildings and structures in Darien, Connecticut
Stations along New York, New Haven and Hartford Railroad lines
Railroad stations in Fairfield County, Connecticut
Railway stations in the United States opened in 1848